Corps-Nuds (Gallo: Cornut) is a commune in the Ille-et-Vilaine department of Brittany in north-western France.

Population
Inhabitants of Corps-Nuds are called Cornusiens in French.

See also
Communes of the Ille-et-Vilaine department

References

External links

Official website 

Mayors of Ille-et-Vilaine Association 

Communes of Ille-et-Vilaine